Charles William O'Hara (1817 – 20 May 1870), known as Charles William Cooper until 27 November 1860, was an Irish Conservative politician.

He was educated at Trinity College, Dublin.

O'Hara was elected Conservative MP for Sligo County at the 1859 general election and held the seat until 1865 when he did not seek re-election.

Arms

References

External links
 

1817 births
1870 deaths
19th-century Irish landowners
Irish Conservative Party MPs
UK MPs 1859–1865
People from County Sligo
Members of the Parliament of the United Kingdom for County Sligo constituencies (1801–1922)
Alumni of Trinity College Dublin